Ranikhet District is newly proposed district to split Almora district in the state of Uttarakhand, India. Its area is 1397 km2 and population is 322,408

Tehsils
Ranikhet
Salt
Bhikiyasain
Dwarahat
Chaukhutia
Syalde

Blocks
Eight

Visiting places
Ranikhet is a hill station.

Religious places

Jhula Devi Temple

References

Proposed districts of Uttarakhand